Association may refer to:

Club (organization), an association of two or more people united by a common interest or goal
Trade association, an organization founded and funded by businesses that operate in a specific industry
Voluntary association, a body formed by individuals to accomplish a purpose, usually as volunteers

Association in various fields of study
Association (archaeology), the close relationship between objects or contexts.
Association (astronomy), combined or co-added group of astronomical exposures
Association (chemistry)
Association (ecology), a type of ecological community 
Genetic association, when one or more genotypes within a population co-occur
Association (object-oriented programming), defines a relationship between classes of objects
Association (psychology), a connection between two or more concepts in the mind or imagination
Association (statistics), a statistical relationship between two variables 
File association, associates a file with a software application 
Security association, the establishment of security attributes between two communication networks

Particular entities
Continental Association, often called the "Association", an economic boycott during the American Revolution
HMS Association (1697), a Royal Navy ship which sank in 1707
L'Association, a French comic book publisher
The Association, an American soft rock band
 The Association (album), 1969

See also

Associate (disambiguation)
Free association (disambiguation)
Associative property in mathematics
Interpersonal relationship
Friendship 
Association Football
Registered association (Germany) (An eingetragener Verein)